Blackfriars Leicester is a former Dominican Friary in Leicester, England.

History
The friary  was founded in 1284 by the Earl of Leicester, and was constructed on an island formed by the River Soar.

Queen Eleanor, wife of King Henry III, left £5 in her will to the friary. In 1301 the friary received another royal gifts: seven oak trees (presumably the wood from which) from Rockingham Forest. Further monetary gifts from the royal family reveal that in 1328/29 there were 30 friars, and in 1334/35 there were 32.

Leicester held the provincial chapters for the Dominican Order in 1301, 1317 and 1334.

In 1489 King Henry VII donated oaks to the friary for the reconstruction of the friar's dormitory.

The friary was dissolved as part of King Henry VIII's dissolution of the monasteries and was surrendered in November 1538. At the time the friary was home to the prior and nine friars. The former friary was granted to Henry Grey, 1st Duke of Suffolk, in 1546.

Nothing remains of the friary.

Priors of Blackfriars, Leicester
List of known priors of Leicester Blackfriars:

John Garland, occurs 1394.
William Ceyton, occurs 1505. 
Ralph Burrell, occurs 1538.

Civil parish 
Leicester Blackfriars was a civil parish, in 1891 the parish had a population of 2512. The parish was formed in 1858, on 26 March 1896 the parish was abolished and merged with Leicester.

References

External links
Official Holy Cross Priory Leicester website

Monasteries in Leicestershire
Leicester
Monasteries dissolved under the English Reformation